ANNUALEX or AnnualEx (AE) is a military exercise by the United States Navy and the Japan Maritime Self-Defense Force. It is annually held in the Southern Sea of Japan. 

The official definition reads: [ANNUALEX] …

History
The first ANNUALEX was held between November 5 and 15, 1996. ANNUALEX 13g was held from November 4–11, 2016, and participation included 750 American military personnel.

ANNUALEX 2021 was held from November 21–30 in the Philippine Sea. Five international navies participated, including the Royal Australian Navy (RAN), Royal Canadian Navy (RCN), German Navy (GMN), Japan Maritime Self-Defense Force (JMSDF), and the U.S. Navy.

References

External links

Annual events in Japan
Japan Maritime Self-Defense Force
Japan–United States military relations
Military exercises involving the United States
Naval exercises
Sea of Japan
United States Navy